McGee Creek is a stream in northeastern Wayne County in the U.S. state of Missouri. The stream is a tributary to the Mingo Swamp.

The stream headwaters arise in northern Wayne County (at ) and the stream flows east-southeast parallel to Missouri Route P. It crosses under Route TT just north of McGee and continues to the southeast crossing under Route Z just prior to entering the swamp (at ).

McGee Creek has the name of the local  family.

See also
List of rivers of Missouri

References

Rivers of Wayne County, Missouri
Rivers of Missouri